, provisional designation , is a trans-Neptunian object and centaur, approximately  in diameter. It was discovered on 16 May 2013, by the Pan-STARRS 1 survey at Haleakala Observatory, Hawaii, United States. The object's orbit is highly inclined and very eccentric, with a perihelion closer to the Sun than Uranus and at an aphelion 17 times farther from the Sun than Neptune.

Orbit and classification 

 orbits the Sun at a distance of 16.8–538.9 AU once every 4631 years and 1 month (1,691,491 days; semi-major axis of 277.83 AU). Its orbit has an eccentricity of 0.94 and an inclination of 85° with respect to the ecliptic. The body's observation arc begins with its official discovery observation by Pan-STARRS at Haleakala Observatory in May 2013.

Numbering and naming 

This minor planet was numbered by the Minor Planet Center on 25 September 2018. As of 2018, it has not been named.

Features 
 has a highly inclined orbit typical of scattered objects and orbits nearly perpendicular to the ecliptic.

References

External links 
 List Of Centaurs and Scattered-Disk Objects, Minor Planet Center
 Discovery Circumstances: Numbered Minor Planets (520001)-(525000) – Minor Planet Center
 
 

523719
523719
523719
20130516